Jumpin Joseph (foaled 1966 in Ontario) is a Canadian Thoroughbred Champion racehorse.

Background
Jumpin Joseph was bred by William Beasley and raced by his son, Warren. Out of the stakes-winning mare, Skinny Minny, a daughter of the 1949 Kentucky Derby winner,  Ponder, he was a son of Australian sire Pago Pago whose racing wins included the 1963 Golden Slipper Stakes.

Trained by Bobby Bateman,

Racing career
As a two-year-old, Jumpin Joseph won stakes races at his home base at Woodbine Racetrack in Toronto, Ontario. At age three his wins included Canada's most prestigious race, the Queen's Plate  and a track record equalling victory in the Achievement Handicap. The colt's 1969 performances earned him  Canadian Horse of the Year honours.

Stud record
Retired from racing, Jumpin Joseph stood at stud in Canada until being sent to breeders in Australia for the 1975 season. He met with limited success as a sire.

References
 Jumpin Joseph's pedigree and partial racing stats
 June 22, 1969 New York Times article on Jumpin Joseph's win in the Queen's Plate

1966 racehorse births
Racehorses bred in Ontario
Racehorses trained in Canada
King's Plate winners
Canadian Thoroughbred Horse of the Year
Thoroughbred family 14-f